KSGR (branded as "Solid Ground Radio 91.1") is a FM religious radio station that serves the Corpus Christi, Texas area. It is under the ownership of Calvary Chapel of the Coastlands, Inc. "Solid Ground" is a reference to the Biblical Parable of the two builders.

External links
KSGR official website

SGR
SGR